Dickheads were a brand of matches released by Australian businessman Dick Smith in 1999, and later discontinued. The name is a pun on the Redheads brand of matches.

The match boxes were originally printed and made in North Richmond, New South Wales, Australia by Hanna Match, from local and imported materials. The graphic designer who designed the iconic brand was Craig Gregory. Later they were distributed by Steric Trading Pty Ltd in Villawood NSW. While the matchsticks and matchheads were made overseas, local packaging allowed the product to be labelled "Australian made". These matchboxes were first sold in boxes of 25, "DICKHEADS 25", then 22,"DICKHEADS 22" and finally 20 "DICKHEADS 20".

The back of the box reads:

Although the original packs were discontinued, packs of 5 "seed sticks" in the same style are available from the Dick Smith Foods website.

References 

Manufacturing companies established in 1999
Matches (firelighting)
Australian brands
1999 establishments in Australia